Rugby league was introduced to the Pacific Games in 2007 at Apia in Samoa. Rugby league nines is the form of the game currently played at the Pacific Games. The 7-a-side version of the game was played at the 2009 Pacific Mini Games.

Pacific Games

Men

Women

Medal table
The all-time medal standings for rugby league at the Pacific Games, including the South Pacific Games, from 2007–present is collated in the table below. This includes both men's and women's events.

Pacific Mini Games

Men's tournament

References

 
Pacific Games
Rugby league in Oceania
Pacific Games